Tahira Imam is a Pakistani television and theatre actress. She appeared in television serials such as Sadqay Tumhare, Mor Mahal, Choti Si Zindagi, Ghughi and Parizaad. She also acted in a segment of A-Plus TV's morning show.

Filmography

Film 
 Dum Mastam (2022)

Theater 

Aadhi Baat (2010)
Dara (2104)

Television

References 

Year of birth missing (living people)
Living people
Place of birth missing (living people)
Pakistani television actresses
Pakistani stage actresses